Dinofroz is an Italian animated series made by Giochi Preziosi in partnership with the Italian studio Mondo TV.

History
The series depicts the adventures of Tom Carter, a 12-year-old boy and his friends who, after playing a board game, are teleported to the past where they can transform into dinosaurs using stones called Rockfroz. It was foretold in legends that the dinofroz would come to save the people dinosaurs and world from the merciless rule of the dragons. The Shaman is a magician with immense magical  powers who is a major help to the dinofroz in their journey to destroy the lord of dragons Neceron in retaining the rockfroz. The rockfroz is a unique rock fragment giving the dinofroz special powers in fighting the cruel generals of Neceron and their subordinate dragons. Another important help for the dinofroz is a huge mammoth named Nelsten whose family was killed by Neceron in an arm to arm combat. Tom's father is another important person who travels ahead of the four friends in time in order to save Tom from the dragon lord's cruel wrath.

Characters

Protagonists
Tom Carter, the group's leader: Tom is charismatic and secure. His father is a famous paleontologist, who disappeared during a research expedition. Tom, curious to find out what happened to his father, looks in his father's lab and finds an odd board game. With the board game, he and his friends can teleport to the past and transform into dinosaurs. He finds out that he and his friends have to save the world from Neceron, the Lord of the Dragons and his allies. Tom transforms into a Tyrannosaurus rex, and in the last episode, successfully defeats Neceron, and saves the futures of the dinosaurs and the human race. In season 2, Tom gets the Dinowatch. A high tech wrist device that allows him to transform into metallic dinosaurs. The Dinowatch contains; Tyrannosaurus rex, Smilodon, Gigantopithecus, and Velociraptor. Later on when they can extract DNA from other dinosaurs, Tom gets two new forms; Triceratops and Ankylosaurus.
Bob: Transforms into a Triceratops. He is really loyal to Tom and likes eating. He is very strong and good at combat.
John: Transforms into a Smilodon. He is independent and a good fighter. He works as a circus stunt performer and is very fast on legs. John is a very important part of dinofroz helping the dinofroz immeasurably by showcasing his natural human borne talents to retain the rockfroz.
Eric: Transforms into a Pterosaur. He is a master of technology. He is loyal to Tom, but not very self-confident

Antagonists
Neceron, Lord of The Dragons: Neceron is the Lord of all Dragons. He is merciless and will do anything in order to defeat the Dinofroz. He only cares about himself, the enslavement of humans and torturing non dragon animals. His breed is unknown. He is killed in the first-season finale by Tom.
General Vlad, the Vampire Dragon: Vlad is one of Neceron's generals. He appears to be an aged, a veteran warrior and more skilled than the other generals, Gladius and Kobrax. He is Neceron's most appreciated general, but this won't prevent Neceron from stealing his powers in the last episode. He was once attacked by Gladius and Kobrax, who were jealous of him. They seriously wounded him, but he managed to stay alive. Vlad was also good friends with Treek, another dragon. However, Treek betrayed him and their friendship ended. But still, Vlad freed Treek when Neceron had captured him. He can minimize himself, and by biting his foes neck, he can transform the unlucky victim into a vampire dragon not a ordinary vampire. It is possible that he did not die at the end of the series, as he was not seen  buried under the rocks like the other Generals, after the Rockfroz explosion. Vlad is not completely evil. He appears to be very loyal and sensible too. He reappears in the second season as Treek/Drakemon's general. Soon Vlad realized that Drakemon is becoming insane and eventually helps the Dinofroz to save the world; proving that Vlad was the true future spy that Drakemon feared of from the whole season. His new appearance is more different than his wyvern-like body, he resembles more of a two tailed European dragon with bat ears.
General Gladius, the Gladiator Dragon: Gladius is one of Neceron's generals. He appears to be the youngest and is not very wise. He blindly obeys his lord, and even after Neceron stole his powers, he refused to accept that his lord was wrong. Gladius is very strong but he has difficulties fighting the Dinofroz. He is very jealous of Vlad and along with Kobrax tried to kill Vlad. Gladius would have killed Vlad but two Vendetta Dragons appeared and he did not get the chance. Gladius mainly has fire-based powers. At the end of the series, he is seen to be buried under rocks after the Rockfroz explosion.
General Kobrax, the Serpent Dragon: Kobrax is one of Neceron's generals. He seems to be older than Gladius, but a lot younger than Vlad. He is very intelligent, but he uses his cleverness for evil purposes. He is very sly and he is very jealous of Vlad. He never acts thoughtlessly, and he is always word-fighting with Vlad. Kobrax can spit a paralyzing venom, a deadly venom and fire. He can also tangle the foes with vines and squeeze them. He is a very dangerous dragon, but obeys Neceron quite blindly. He wants to be the greatest of the generals, which made him try to kill Vlad. At the end of the series, he is seen to be buried under rocks after the Rockfroz explosion.
General Treek/Drakemon: Treek is Neceron's former general and the only dragon along with Neceron of unknown breed, although he looks like a Vendetta Dragon and also a dragon with Triceratops characteristics (as the name suggests). He is the only dragon who knows that the dragons are going to be extinct if Neceron continues to rule, but he is considered a traitor and was imprisoned. At one point, he escaped by tricking Gladius and organised a Revolt of the Dragons. His army was overpowered by Neceron's soldiers. He fights with Vlad, trying to convince him of Neceron's intentions. Vlad doesn't believe him and Treek was forced to hurt him in order to make him listen. When Treek was ready to smash his claws at Vlad, Kobrax appeared and spits him venom on Treek. Then Treek has imprisoned yet again. When Neceron orders Galdius and Kobrax to kill him, Vlad interferes and says he wants to take revenge on Treek, as Treek betrayed him. Despite the anger Vlad had at Treek for betraying him, he frees Treek. Treek leaves and did not appear until the final battle, when he tries to find Vlad and save him. He is the only other general besides Vlad, who is sure to still be alive. Treek's DNA is found by Professor Warnell, an old friend of James Carter. He returns in Season 2 as the main antagonist, renaming himself Drakemon. He is more humanoid and more different than his original, Drakemon has a mane made out of fire on his head to his back neck; along with Vald, Arctic and Petraeus who all three also have fire manes. As Drakemon, his goal to save the dragon species from extinction he is more paranoid when he suspect a traitorous spy in his rank. When Drakemon and Tom face each other in the final showdown, Drakemon was about to push Tom (as a T.Rex) in a fiery cavern, but Tom pushed Drakemon off him and Drakemon falls in the cavern killing him and his futureself.
General Artik: Arctic is one of Treek/Drakemon's generals. He is a white bearded Asian dragon who his design resembles a bit like a ninja. Arctic use his wings as blades. Arctic is a calm and intellect but aggressive stragesit. He has a kindred friendship with Petraeus since both were recruited as generals at the same time. He along with Petraeus keep questioning Lord Drakemon of his plans and secrets that Drakemon keep hiding from them. General Arctic was accused of being a spy and a traitor to Drakemon and was put in the gladiator area to fight against the Fighter Dragons and Arctic was soon put in prison. From his accusation he was replaced with Natterjack to take his place as general.
General Petraeus: Petraeus is one of Treek/Drakemon's general. He is a short red dragon with a hammer on his tail and his wings look shield-like. His appearance seem closely related to a Viking design He smacks his hammer tail on the ground to make shockwaves and use his wings as a shield. Petraeus seem to be rough and slightly aggressive when things are getting off track with suspicion of a traitorous spy. Petraeus has a kindred friendship with General Arctic since both were recruited as generals at the same time. He along with Arctic keep questioning Lord Drakemon of his plans and secrets that Drakemon keeps hiding from them.

Minor Characters
Professor James Carter: Tom's father and a world-famous paleontologist. James went missing discovering artifacts about Jurassic area. He was actually captured as a Prisoner of Neceron; believed to know about the Door of Time.
The Shaman: A Mystical Wizard who aids the Dinofoz in finding pieces of Rockfroz. He also provides help in finding Tom's father James. He mysteriously disappears in Season 2. He is usually around Nelson. He reappeared in the final episode of Season 2 in the end, when he was living on the floating island in space and which reveal that The Shaman might be an alien or a ghost.
Nelsten: A Woolly Mammoth friend of the Dinofoz and Keira. He was granted magical powers by the shaman to get revenge on Neceron; after watching Neceron torture and kill his family.
Keira: A young village girl who is the love interest of Tom. She is the only female in the series to know about the Dinofroz.
Professor Ted Warnell: An old friend of James Carter, who double-crossed him by working for the Double Delta Division (DDD). He is interested in the content of James's watch.
Sveva: A girl who goes to the same school as the Dinofroz. She is the love interest of John.
Alice: A friend of Sveva and Liaia. She is the love interest of Bob.
Liaia: A friend of Sveva and Alice. She is the only one without a love interest. (meaning it's possible she could be paired with Eric)
Professor Paul Stroker: Will's father, who made his son a hybrid Dragon Man and plans to rule the world.
Will Stroker: Professor Stroker's son, who is made a hybrid Dragon Man by his father.
Nancy warnell: Dr. Warnell's daughter, a military officer.
Burt: Professor Stroker's assistant, who helps Stroker in his plan to rule the world.
Helen: Professor Stroker's assistant, who is unaware of Stroker's plan to rule the world.
Dr. Hoda: A scientist working for Double Delta Division, who is unaware of Stroker's plan to rule the world.
Jeno: A cave boy who has a scar on his face and lives in the same village with Keira. He has a crush on Keira and was Jealous of Tom because Keira loves Tom. He left his village to join Stroker and willingly become a Man Dragon Hybrid.
Tusk: a little pegomastax. Bob's pet.

Dragon Tribes
Warrior Dragons: They're a species of dragons that are used to attack the Dinofroz and guard prisoners. They are also called Guard Dragons. Warrior Dragons are grey-green in color and have saw-like spikes on their back. They have four legs, two wings, and two tails. Their eyes are magenta and they have a light green underside. They have three clawed toes facing forward on their feet.
Vampire Dragons: Vampire Dragons are a type of dragon used to attack the Dinofroz. They are commanded by General Vlad. Vampire Dragons have two different appearances. They can either be dark blue with light blue wings, or light blue with dark blue wings. They have a yellow underside, and yellow frills coming out of their jaw. Their arms have two clawed fingers, and are attached to their wings. They have spikes on their back, and have two large front fangs. They can either walk on both two or four legs. Vampire Dragons can sense ultrasound sonar waves, making them immune to the "Shockwave" Dinofroz power. They are also capable of making any living thing they bite into a vampire if they bite them. They can transform into any size to aid in their attacks. Vampire dragons are also capable of shape-shifting. They can drain the energy of their opponents, as well as possess them.
Gladiator Dragons: They're a species of dragon used by the Dragons to attack the Dinofroz. They are commanded by General Gladius. They are also called Dragon Warriors. Gladiator Dragons are red and grey in color. They have a large horn on their nose and two spikes on the back of their head. They have four legs, two wings, and one tail. Their front feet have three clawed toes and a thumb like claw. The back feet have tree clawed toes as well. They have grey wing membranes and a grey underside. Their eyes are yellow. Gladiator Dragons are able to shoot electricity-like projectiles from their wing-claws. They can also shoot a flame net, or "Golden Net", or "Glowing Net", through their wing-claws. They are immune to burning hot temperatures.
Serpent Dragons: They're a type of Dragon used to attack the Dinofroz. They are commanded by General Kobrax. They are also called Dragon Snakes. Serpent Dragons have two colorations. They can either be green and purple, or dark green and purple. They have short wings and purple horns coming from behind their eyes. They have two long fangs and a snake tongue. Their tails are longer than most dragons and they have a purple underside. Their feet have three clawed toes, and their eyes have a red ring around them. Because of their long tails, Serpent Dragons are capable of wrapping themselves around their opponent and suffocate them. They can also spit paralyzing poison.
Treek's Tribe: They're a type of Dragon. They are commanded by General Treek.

Dragon Mutants
New dragons that aren't part of any of the Dragon Tribes from Season 1. Each are separated and have their own powers and even appearances from bathing in The Fires Of Galgoth, sacred lava that makes dragons more powerful. They are champions of the week for each episode when they face Tom and the Dinofroz gang, but some do return for a rematch.
Spider Yarn: A spider dragon who shoots webs from his mouth. His wings are also covered in his web.
Spectro: A slender ghost-type dragon with ramming speed like a torpedo and also has ghost powers. He returns in Episode 13.
Hammerhead: A two headed construction truck-like dragon who use their wings as a spiked shield. The two heads have separate personalities. They use their heads as their namesake. They return in Episode 15.
Silver Flash: A silver dragon who is super fast. He has giant yellow stegosaurus plates on his back. He returns in Episode 14.
Poison Wing: A colorful poisonous mushroom dragon.
Dragon Fire: A living armor dragon made out of fire. He wears the armor as skin to keep himself together. He returns in Episode 16.
Thunder Dragon: An electric-type dragon that can create storms. He can shoot both fire and lightning, usually from his wings. He returns in Episode 17.
Dragon Blade: A metallic mantis-like dragon with a slight pteranodon appearance. He can throw his scythe blade hands and even his scythe-like wings. He returns in Episode 18
Natterjack: A dragon frog who can spit poisonous slim. He was the first dragon to win a fight against Tom and the Dinofroz in a rematch (due to being part of the plan to fake a retreat). When General Arctic was blamed for being a traitor, Drakemon made Natterjack a general, taking Arctic's place. He returned in Episode 19 and then continue appearing more as a general.
Nest Dragon (Legion in English): A feathered buffalo-like dragon with six small parrot-like dragons that roost on the dragon's tusk or horns. They have a hive mind connection with each other. They were the first Dragon Mutant to be seen abducted by Stroker and his men to do experiments on Nest Dragon/Legion. He was freed by Vlad in Episode 21 and assist Vlad to free the other captive dragons.
Turtle Dragon: A turtle-like dragon with retractable beetle wings. He was the first dragon to win his first fight against the Dinofroz.
-Fighter Dragons: Warrior dragon soldiers that resemble Vendetta Dragons but now colored red like Gladiator Dragons.

Objects
SpinRock: It is able to absorb the energy of nature and becomes pure energy, transforming Tom, Bob, Eric, and John into something that never would have imagined: a powerful and fierce SUPER hero DINOFROZ! The Dinofroz are unique creatures from the prehistoric world capable of using the power of the mysterious ROCKFROZ, a strange mythical crystal. Our heroes find themselves thrown into a war against the dangerous dragons to protect the Rockfroz and save the prehistory and the modern world from the clutches of the evil dragons.

Rockfroz: A unique rock fragment giving the dinofroz special powers in fighting the cruel generals of Neceron and their subordinate dragons.

Dino Watch: Tom's watch that helps him transform into dinosaurs. T-Rex, Smilodon, Triceratops, Velociraptor, Gorilla, and Ankylosaur.

Fire Rock: A rock fragment that can combined power.

Jurassic Truck: The famous vehicle of Dinofroz team from second season that was created and invent by Tom's grandfather Gabriel Carter. It is a strange light blue armored tank to dinosaur shape crawler. This armored vehicle have a cannon to centre which find here on the dinosaur mouth and two small laser cannons which goes out from stuffed of vehicle. The central cannon also can throw an electric net if it click here the red bottom for throwing it, there is a crochet to mouth finish which serve for pull every materials and there is an openable tailgate with forced spears behind.

Voice cast

Italian
Fabi di Ranno

Valeria Gasi

Ricardo Mazza

English
Rory Max Kaplan

David Errigo

Billy Bob Thompson

Mike Pollock

Marc Thompson

Graham Halstead

Alyson Leigh Rosenfeld

David Wills

Jake Paque

Allen Enlow

Episodes

Season 1 (2012)

Season 2: Dragon's Revenge (2015)

International broadcasting
 India - Discovery Kids
 India - ETV Bal bharat: 
 Mexico - a+: 
 Southeast Asia - Cartoon Network
 UK - Disney XD: 
 Canada - Teletoon/Télétoon: 
 France - Gulli: 2013
 Philippines - GMA Network:

References

External links
 
 Dinofroz Dragon's Revenge (IMDb)
 Mondo TV

2012 Italian television series debuts
2015 Italian television series endings
2010s animated television series
Italian children's animated action television series
Italian children's animated adventure television series
Italian children's animated fantasy television series
Italian flash animated television series
Disney XD original programming
Animated television series about children
Animated television series about dinosaurs
Teletoon original programming
Animated television series about dragons